William Radstock (fl. 1414) of Bath, Somerset, was an English politician.

He was a Member (MP) of the Parliament of England for Bath in November 1414.

References

14th-century births
15th-century deaths
English MPs November 1414
People from Bath, Somerset